Second Fiddle is a 1957 British comedy film directed by Maurice Elvey and starring Adrienne Corri, Thorley Walters, Lisa Gastoni and Richard Wattis. The film was produced by Robert Dunbar for Act Films Ltd. It was the final film of prolific director Maurice Elvey.

The title comes from the phrase "to play second fiddle" in allusion to an orchestra, meaning to be ignored in relation to some other more important party whilst putting in as much effort.

Second Fiddle was missing from the BFI National Archive, and was listed as one of the British Film Institute's "75 Most Wanted" lost films. BFI's update on the list reveals that the film is now found and commercially available on DVD from mid-2015.

Plot
Deborah and Charles are an engaged couple, and both are young executives at the successful Pontifex Advertising Agency in London. Deborah writes very successful jingles for television commercials, whilst Charles creates advertisements for print publications. However, the Pontifex board of directors will only allow the employment of single women on their staff, so Deborah worries about her future with the company if they get married, although Charles believes a successful man should be able to support a stay-at-home housewife.

Just before they get married, Deborah is asked to compose a series of jingles in a very short time and then take them to the company's New York office to run an advertising campaign there. This results in her spending most of her time at the office and seeing very little of Charles. Meanwhile, a promotion which Charles was hoping for goes to someone else. After their wedding, Deborah has to immediately fly to New York, and while she is away Charles is flattered by the attentions of his attractive secretary Pauline and spends time with her outside work. At the same time, he is annoyed that Deborah seems to be writing to everyone else in the office but he has had only two postcards, despite her promise to write letters.

Eventually, a campaign by the staff to change the company's policy on the employment of married women leads to a long debate by the board of directors which is dominated by the owner of the company, Lord Pontifex. Eventually, alarmed at the prospect of losing Deborah, he agrees to the change, and the staff have a party to celebrate.

On returning from their delayed honeymoon, Charles and Deborah arrive at their apartment and find an important letter that she had sent from New York but which Charles hadn't collected, and they also find many gifts from their clients, with more than one of many of them. Deborah announces that she is pregnant.

Cast
 Adrienne Corri as Deborah
 Thorley Walters as Charles
 Lisa Gastoni as Pauline
 Richard Wattis as Bill Turner
 Bill Fraser as Nixon
 Aud Johansen as Greta
 Brian Nissen as Jack Carter
 Ryck Rydon as Chuck
 Jill Melford as Dolly
 Joy Webster as Joan
 Dino Galvani as Dino
 Johnny Briggs as Jimmy
 Launce Maraschal as Pontifex
 Frederick Piper as Potter
 Beckett Bould as General
 Madoline Thomas as Emily Pfennig ("Fenny")
 Ian Whittaker as Delivery Boy
 Christina Lubicz as waitress in the Tahiti

Critical reception
DVD Compare wrote, "it’s a film that is photographed in a very static way, in a studio setting (Shepperton Studios) and with much use of long takes and theatrical ‘side-on’ blocking of actors – but this fits the material like a glove. It's a funny, enjoyable film which also slyly comments on issues of gender at work and at home."

References

External links

1957 films
1950s English-language films
1957 comedy films
Films directed by Maurice Elvey
British comedy films
1950s rediscovered films
Rediscovered British films
1950s British films